William Dawson was launched at Lancaster in 1812 as a West Indiaman. In 1818–1819, she made one voyage to India, sailing under a licence from the British East India Company (EIC). Thereafter William Dawson sailed to North America, primarily Canada from homeports such as Liverpool and later Alloa. She suffered several relatively minor mishaps and was last listed in 1859.

Career
William Dawson first appeared in Lloyd's Register (LR), in 1813.

On 13 April 1813, William Dawson, William Ashton, and Mary captured the American schooner Miranda, which was on her way from Kennebunk to Cuba. The three British ships were coming from St Croix. However, the United States privateer Paul Jones recaptured Miranda, only to have  recapture her.

In 1813 the British East India Company (EIC) had lost its monopoly on the trade between India and Britain. British ships were then free to sail to India or the Indian Ocean under a licence from the EIC. 

William Dawson sailed in April 1818 for Bengal. On 19 July 1818, she was at the Cape of Good Hope, on her way to Bengal. On 2 August she arrived at Bengal. In January 1819, Lloyd's List reported that a heavily laden vessel had run foul of William Dawson, Scott, master, in the Hooghly River. William Dawson had to go into dock for repairs. She sailed from the Sand Heads on 19 November, the Cape on 13 January 1820, and arrived at Liverpool on 22 March. Here cargo included sugar, saltpeter, ginger, wheat, and the like.

On 25 August 1822 William Dawson, Bamber, master, put into St. Pierre, Martinique. She had been on her way from Demerara to Liverpool when she lost her masts on 21 August between Barbados and Martinique. She had sailed from Demerara on 15 August. She sailed from Martinique on 9 September and arrived at Liverpool on 21 October

By one report, on 8 May 1824 Matthew and Thomas foundered in the Atlantic Ocean. William Dawson rescued all aboard. However, Lloyd's List only reported that she had arrived at Holyhead from Miramichi, having spoke with several vessels, including Matthew and Thomas before Matthew and Thomas had foundered.

On 14 July 1831 William Dawson, Mitchell, master, on her way from Miramichi to Shields, went on shore at Goswick, near Holy Island.

On 20 April 1836 William Dawson, Beveridge, master, had to put into Greenock as she had sprung a leak. She was on her way from Alloa to Quebec.

On 19 May 1841 a gale at Quebec severely damaged William Dawson.

Fate
William Dawson was last listed in the volume of Lloyd's Register for 1859.

Notes, citations, and references
Notes
  
Citations

References
 

1812 ships
Age of Sail merchant ships of England
Maritime incidents in May 1824
Maritime incidents in May 1841